Sverre Håkon Bagge (born 7 August 1942 in Bergen) is a Norwegian historian.

He took his doctorate with the thesis Den politiske ideologi i Kongespeilet, published in 1979. From 1974 to 1991 he worked as an associate professor (førsteamanuensis) at the University of Bergen, and he became a professor there in 1991. Since 2003 he is the leader of the Centre for Medieval Studies, Bergen.

He is a member of the Norwegian Academy of Science and Letters.

Selected bibliography
Cross and Scepter: The Rise of the Scandinavian Kingdoms from the Vikings to the Reformation, 2014
From Viking Stronghold to Christian Kingdom: State Formation in Norway, c. 900-1350, 2010
Den politiske ideologi i Kongespeilet, 1979
Høymiddelalderen, 1984, volume 8 in Cappelens Verdenshistorie
Europa tar form, År 300 til 1300, 1986
Norge i dansketiden 1380-1814, 1987 (with Knut Mykland)
Society and Politics in Snorri Sturlusons Heimskringla, 1991
Mennesket i middelalderens Norge: tanker, tro og holdninger 1000-1300, 1998
Da boken kom til Norge, 2001, volume 1 in Norsk idéhistorie

References

University of Bergen
List of publications in FRIDA

1942 births
Living people
Norwegian medievalists
University of Bergen alumni
Academic staff of the University of Bergen
Members of the Norwegian Academy of Science and Letters
Royal Norwegian Society of Sciences and Letters